Syria competed at the 2022 World Athletics Championships in Eugene, Oregon from 15 to 24 July 2022. Syria has entered 1 athlete.

Results

Men
Field events

References

Syria
World Championships in Athletics
2022